Lawrence Vavra (born 15 November 1977) is an American Media Entrepreneur and Private Equity Investor. Vavra is best known for co-founding music management company SFX Entertainment and Deckstar.

Education and career
Vavra graduated from UCLA undergrad in 1999 and Hastings Law School in 2002 where he received his Juris Doctor. After graduation, Vavra created the San Francisco based company Vintage415.

Vavra and DJ AM
In early 2002 upon his return to Los Angeles, Vavra began working with DJ AM. The two had known each other through mutual friends and reacquainted through Vavra's brother. The two quickly built up DJ AM's career giving validity to the DJ art form and paving the way for many of today's DJ acts.  Together they opened up the popular night clubs LAX in both Los Angeles, as well as Las Vegas.  Vavra also established DJ AM as the first Las Vegas resident DJ at The Hard Rock Hotel and Casino, before re-negotiating AM's biggest career move to The Palms Casino Resort where he became the highest paid DJ. The two remained close friends and business partners until DJ AM's tragic death on August 28, 2009.

Vavra and Deckstar
Vavra is the co-Founder and president of DECKSTAR, a company he started with Paul Rosenberg, Matt Colon and DJ AM in 2006. The company merged with British Management company James Grant in 2017.

Vavra has also produced MTV's Gone Too Far and Fuse's Hoppus On Music. Vavra was responsible for producing the first ever Electronic Dance Music performance at the 2012 Grammy Awards.

Controversy

The company SFX Entertainment, now known as LiveStyle quickly raised $250 million to create the Live Nation of Electronic Dance Music, culminating in an initial public offering on October 9, 2013 on the NASDAQ, valuing the company at over $1B.  Vavra and the Gabriel Moreno sued co-founder Robert Sillerman for fraud, and breach of partnership. The suit was subsequently settled in 2016 for an undisclosed amount.

References

External links

1977 births
Living people
American music managers